Allobates peruvianus is a species of frog in the family Aromobatidae. It is found in Peru where it occurs on the lower Amazonian slopes of the Andes; its range possibly extends into adjacent Bolivia and Ecuador.
Its natural habitats are premontane forests. It is threatened by habitat loss.

References

peruvianus
Amphibians of the Andes
Amphibians of Peru
Endemic fauna of Peru
Amphibians described in 1941
Taxonomy articles created by Polbot